The Economy of Sound is the fifth studio album by American post-grunge band Seven Mary Three. The album peaked at #178 on the Billboard 200 on June 23, 2001.

The album's Billboard-charting singles were "Wait" (#7 on Hot Mainstream Rock Tracks and #21 on Hot Modern Rock Tracks) and "Sleepwalking" (#39 on Hot Mainstream Rock Tracks).

Critical reception
The Encyclopedia of Popular Music wrote that the album "jettisoned the vestiges of the band's grunge sound in favour of crowd pleasing hard rock."

Track listing
All songs written by Jason Ross, except where noted.

Album credits
 Jason Ross – lead vocals, rhythm guitar
 Thomas Juliano – lead guitar, backing vocals
 Casey Daniel – bass
 Giti Khalsa - drums
 Kevin McKendree – keyboards
 Eric Gardner – percussion

Production
Producers: Jason Ross, Tom Morris, and Neal Avron
Engineering: Tom Morris with Matt Martone
Mixing: Neal Avron, except Tracks 1 and 2 mixed by Chris Lord-Alge
Mastering: Bob Ludwig
Art Direction: Lane Wurster
Graphic Design: Chris Eselgroth
Photography: Christian Lantry

References

2001 albums
Seven Mary Three albums
Albums produced by Neal Avron
Albums recorded at Morrisound Recording